Fieldstone is a suburb in Melbourne, Victoria, Australia,  west of Melbourne's Central Business District, located within the City of Melton local government area.

The suburb was gazetted by the Office of Geographic Names on 9 February 2017, following a proposal for eleven new suburbs by the City of Melton. The new name is expected to officially come into effect in mid-2017.

Prior to the suburb's creation, the area was part of Mount Cottrell.

References

External links

Suburbs of Melbourne
Suburbs of the City of Melton